Joseph Millot Severn was an English writer, historian, and phrenologist born in Codnor, Derbyshire.

Biography
Severn was born in 1860 and worked as a phrenologist in Brighton. He was President of the British Phrenological Association. This association started in the 1880s and was disbanded in 1967. Severn wrote a number of books and funded some almhouses in his home village of Codnor.

Severn died at his home in Brighton in 1942.

Major works (incomplete)

 My village: Owd Codnor, Derbyshire, and the village folk when I was a boy (1935)
 Phrenology: Up to date (1912)
Popular phrenology (1913)
 Phrenological and physiological chart (1905) [Brighton Phrenological Institution]
Joseph Severn: Letters And Memoirs (Nineteenth Century Series) - by Joseph Severn, Grant F. Scott, Ashgate Publishing (2005)

References

External links
 

1860 births
1942 deaths
People from Codnor
English non-fiction writers
Phrenologists
English male non-fiction writers
People from Brighton